SURF2 is a protein which in humans is encoded by the SURF2 gene.
SURF2 is a member of the surfeit gene family. The SURF2 molecule interacts with beta-1, 4-Gal-T3, uPAR, and WDR20. As part of the surfeit gene cluster, SURF2 is one of several tightly linked genes that do not share sequence similarity. SURF2 maps to human chromosome 9q34.2 and shares a bidirectional promoter with SURF1 on the opposite strand. A bidirectional promoter activity is expected in the intergenic region between SURF1 and SURF2, as seen in mice.

References